In the 2017–18 season, Partizan NIS Belgrade competed in the Basketball League of Serbia, the Radivoj Korać Cup, the Adriatic League and the EuroCup.

Players

Current roster

Players with multiple nationalities
   Đoko Šalić
   Bandja Sy
   Marko Pecarski

Roster changes

In

Out

Pre-season and friendlies

Competitions

Adriatic League

League table

Matches

Basketball League of Serbia

League table (Group B)

Matches

Playoffs

EuroCup

Regular season

Group C

Matches

Kup Radivoja Koraća

Adriatic Supercup

Individual awards
EuroCup

MVP of the Round
 Nigel Williams-Goss – Regular Season, Round 3

Serbian Superleague

MVP
 Nigel Williams-Goss

Top Scorer
 Nigel Williams-Goss

Adriatic League

MVP of the Month
 Patrick Miller – October 2017 
 Novica Veličković – January 2018 

MVP of the Round
 Patrick Miller – Round 5
 Novica Veličković – Round 15
 Novica Veličković – Round 17
 Novica Veličković – Round 21

Ideal Starting Five
 Novica Veličković

Radivoj Korać Cup

MVP
 Nigel Williams-Goss

Top Scorer
 Nigel Williams-Goss

Statistics

Adriatic League

References

External links
 Official website
 Partizan at ABA League.com 

2017-18 
2017–18 in Serbian basketball by club
2017–18 in European basketball by club
2017–18 ABA League First Division